LPR may refer to:
Laryngopharyngeal reflux, a form of acid reflux
Lawful permanent resident
Lazarus Program file
Libertarian Party of Russia
License plate recognition
Line Printer Daemon protocol (RFC1179)
Line Printer Remote service
League of Polish Families (Liga Polskich Rodzin), a Polish political party
Liga Prawicy Rzeczypospolitej (League of the Right of the Republic), a Polish political alliance
Light pollution reduction
Living Planet Report, a WWF analysis on the health of our planet
(Le) Poisson Rouge, a music venue in New York City
Lotnicze Pogotowie Ratunkowe, Polish air ambulance stations
Low-power radio
Long Preston railway station, station code LPR
LPR (cycling team), a former professional cycling team
Luhansk People's Republic, a self-proclaimed statelet in eastern Ukraine